Graziher is an Australian women's magazine, issued quarterly.

Graziher is targeted towards female readers with a strong focus on rural affairs, regional issues and the social aspects relating to life for women who live and work in remote areas of Australia.  As an acknowledgement of the publication's targeted demographic, the title of the magazine is an amalgam of the words grazier and her.

Graziher was first published in December 2015.

The magazine's editor Claire Dunne edits, compiles and designs each issue of Graziher from her family's cattle property, sixty kilometres south of Duaringa in Central Queensland.

References 

Magazines published in Australia
2015 establishments in Australia